Hallettsville High School is a public high school located in the city of Hallettsville, Texas, USA, and classified as a 3A school by the University Interscholastic League. It is a part of the Hallettsville Independent School District located in central Lavaca County. In 2015, the school was rated "Met Standard" by the Texas Education Agency.

Athletics
The Hallettsville Brahmas compete in volleyball, cross country, American football, basketball, powerlifting, golf, tennis, track, baseball and softball.

State titles
Baseball  - 
1995 (3A), 1997 (3A), 2013 (2A)
Softball -
2022(3A)

State finalist
Softball  - 
2009 (3A), 2015 (3A), 2019 (3A)
American football
2020 (3A/D1)

References

External links
Hallettsville ISD website

Public high schools in Texas
Schools in Lavaca County, Texas